Baqiyat Salihat Arabic College (جامعة الباقيات الصالحات) Jami'ah al Baqiyath as Salihat is an Islamic college in Vellore, Tamil Nadu, India that was established in 1857.
The madrasa was founded by Aa'la Hazrat Abdul Wahhab Rahimahullah who is a student of 

The trust of the Madarasa played a vital role in forming the strong Islamic institution in South India. The degreed ulamas are pioneers of thousands of makatibs and madaris in throughout south India and far east countries.

The founder of the college is Shah Abdul Wahhab who is one of the students of Bahrul uloom Saahibul Karaamaat Ash Sheikh Meer Amjad Ibrahim Chinna Hazrat the second of Madurai Maqbara hazrats in Madurai. 

The trust of the Madarasa played a vital role in forming the strong Islamic institution in South India. The degreed ulamas are pioneers of thousands of makatibs and madaris in throughout south India and far east countries.

The famous Tamil translation of Al-Quran by Moulana Abdul Hameed Baqavi was acknowledged by the eminent Muftis and Alims of south India.

The seminary propagates the Sunni Islam and was founded by Shah Abdul Wahab also called as A'ala Hazrat or A'ala Hadrat. The graduates of this Madarasa are known as Baqavi (Baqawi, Baquavi, Baqvi, Bakavi, Bakawi). This Madarasa had produced a good number of well-known Islamic Scholars. Under the title notable alumni a notable scholar and translator of Iman Gazali (rah) 's Eahiyaul ulmudeen Moulavi.S. Abdul Wahab Baquvi 's name is missing. He translated more than 150 books from Arabic Persian and others. He belongs to Nagore, Tamil Nadu.

References

Islamic universities and colleges in India
Islamic schools in India
Madrasas in Tamil Nadu
Universities and colleges in Vellore district
Education in Vellore
1857 establishments in India
Academic institutions formerly affiliated with the University of Madras